Swami Siddheswarananda (1897-1957) was a monk of the Ramakrishna Mission.

Gopal Marar of the Kottilil house or Tharavaad (maternal joint family) of Thrissur, was a prince of the House of Cochin, Kerala in his pre-monastic days.  He was initiated by Swami Brahmananda and popularly called Gopal Maharaj. A charming person, he served as the President of the Mysore branch of Ramakrishna Math. During this time, he was instrumental in shaping the career of Puttappa, legendary Kannada poet Kuvempu. He had great regard for Sri Ramana Maharshi. He founded the Ramakrishna Ashrama at Gretz (Centre Vedantique Ramakrichna), outside Paris, France, in 1947 and spread the message of Vedanta in the French language, becoming well known in France as an author and lecturer.

Some of his writings are:
 Hindu Thought and Carmelite Mysticism 
 Le Yoga et Saint Jean de la Croix : pensée indienne et mystique carmélitaine 
 Some Aspects of Vedanta Philosophy (Lectures given at the University of Toulouse in 1942)(1979 Pbk) 
 Meditation According to Yoga- Vedanta
 Metaphysical Intuition : Seeing God with Open Eyes - Commentaries on the Bhagavad Gita, translation Andre van den Brink
 Rambles in Religion
 God-Realization through Reason

References 

Monks of the Ramakrishna Mission
1897 births
1957 deaths
Indian emigrants to France